I'm No Hero is the 23rd studio album by Cliff Richard, released in 1980. The album features three hit singles, including "Dreamin'" and "A Little in Love", which were top 20 hits in both the UK and the US.

Background

Following the success of his 1979 single "We Don't Talk Anymore" which was written and arranged by Alan Tarney, the record company were keen to use his services again. For the follow-up album in 1980, he was employed as producer for the entire album. This gave I'm No Hero a cohesive sound but was criticised at the time for being too unadventurous. The songs on the album were similar in style to "We Don't Talk Anymore", but it was also a success, generating two top 20 singles, while the album itself made the top five in the UK.

With the lead single "Dreamin'" released in August 1980, the album came out a few weeks later. "Dreamin'" became a top 10 hit in both the UK and US, while follow-up "A Little in Love", released belatedly in January 1981 reached No.15 in the UK and No.17 in the US. The album itself made No.4 in the UK album charts, but due to the lack of singles, failed to sustain as lengthy a run in the Top 75 as his previous album. The delayed release of the second single was most likely due to the release of "Suddenly", a duet with Olivia Newton-John, which had been featured on the  Xanadu  soundtrack. This was also a top 20 hit in the UK and US - making this the most successful period for Cliff Richard in the American market.

The album received positive reviews and kept Richard high in the charts during this, his revival period. It was also the last time he would appear in the US top 20. Album track "Give a Little Bit More", which was co-written by Andy Hill, who was about to become famous as writer and producer for Bucks Fizz, was released in some countries as a single, as was "In the Night" - although this wasn't the same as the Barbara Dickson song which was released around the time (and was also produced by Tarney). "Give a Little Bit More" gave Richard a third hit from the album in the US, peaking at No. 41. This track was unreleased as a single in the UK, where it was covered by Johnny Logan in September 1980, but his version failed to chart.

I'm No Hero was remastered and re-issued on compact disc in July 2001.

Track listing
Side One
 "Take Another Look"  (Alan Tarney)  4:11
 "Anything I Can Do" (Alan Tarney)  4:01
 "A Little in Love" (Alan Tarney)  3:42
 "Here (So Doggone Blue)" (Alan Tarney)  3:50
 "Give a Little Bit More" (Andy Hill, Jonathan Hodge)  3:35

Side Two
 "In the Night"  (Rod Bowkett)  3:48
 "I'm No Hero"  (Trevor Spencer, Alan Tarney)  3:25
 "Dreamin'"  (Leo Sayer, Alan Tarney)  3:40
 "A Heart Will Break" (Trevor Spencer, Alan Tarney)  3:59
 "Everyman" (Alan Tarney)  4:11

Bonus tracks (2001 re-issue):
 "Dynamite"  (Ian Ralph Samwell)  3:12
 "Keep on Looking" (Alan Tarney)  3:40

Personnel
Cliff Richard - vocals
Alan Tarney - bass, guitars, arrangements
Trevor Spencer - drums
Michael Boddicker, Nick Glennie-Smith - keyboards

Charts and certifications

Weekly charts

NOTES:
^ "Dreaming" also made no.83 on the Canadian RPM "Top 100 Singles of 1980" chart.
^^ "A Little in Love" also made no. 33 on the Canadian RPM "Top 100 Singles of 1981" chart.
NR - not released

Certifications

References

Cliff Richard albums
1980 albums
EMI Records albums
Albums produced by Alan Tarney